Keene State College is a public liberal arts college in Keene, New Hampshire. It is part of the University System of New Hampshire. Founded in 1909 as a teacher's college (originally, Keene Normal School; later, Keene Teachers College), Keene State College had 3,104 students enrolled for credit as of fall 2021.

Academics 
Some of the largest academic programs at Keene State College are Education, Business Management/Management, Psychology, Safety & Occupational Health Applied Sciences, and Criminal Justice Studies, according to the declared majors reported in the Keene State College Factbook.

Keene State College offers more than 40 areas of undergraduate study in the liberal arts, social sciences, sciences, and professional programs, as well as selected graduate degrees. Both the Master of Science in Safety & Occupational Health Applied Sciences and Master of Science in Public Health Nutrition are offered as fully online programs. 
Other notable majors include Construction Safety Sciences, Sustainability Studies, Construction Management, Neuroscience, and Nursing. Keene's Factbook 2019-2020 shows that Exercise Science and Criminal Justice Studies are some of the fastest growing majors.

The Safety & Occupational Health Applied Sciences program is the second largest major on campus. This program began holding an annual professional development conference in conjunction with the student ASSE (American Society of Safety Engineers) chapter.

The Education major at Keene State College is a respected teacher education program. The college hosts major annual seminars in children's literature.

The Film Studies program hosts an annual student film festival.

Keene State College recently became the first accredited university in the nation to offer a four-year undergraduate degree in Holocaust and Genocide Studies.

Athletics
Keene State, known athletically as the Owls, is an NCAA Division III school, competing in the Little East Conference. Their mascot is Hootie the Owl, and their colors are red and white.

Current programs include cross-country (men's and women's), basketball (men's and women's), soccer (men's and women's), volleyball, field hockey, baseball, softball, track (indoor and outdoor, men's and women's), lacrosse (men's and women's), swimming and diving (men's and women's). Keene State also offers many club sports: men's soccer, men's and women's rugby, men's and women's ice hockey, ultimate, Brazilian Jiu-Jitsu, dance team, environmental outing, ski & snowboard, and yoga. Keene State's softball team appeared in one Women's College World Series in 1972.

Rankings
Keene State College received high marks from U.S. News & World Report in several categories as part of its 2022 rankings among regional colleges in the North. Rankings include #9 in Best Schools, #5 in Best Undergraduate Teaching, #7 in Top Public Schools, #4 in Best Colleges for Veterans and #10 in Best Value Schools.

The Princeton Review's "2022 Best Colleges: Region by Region" Keene State College was named one of the Best Regional Colleges in the Northeast.

Keene State is one of 224 select colleges and universities in the Northeast that The Princeton Review profiled in its 2006 edition of The Best Northeastern Colleges. The most popular majors are Safety & Occupational Health Applied Sciences, Education, and Psychology.

Greek life

Governing boards 
 Intra Fraternal Council
 Panhellenic Council

Fraternities 
 Alpha Sigma Phi (ΑΣΦ)
 Delta Tau Delta (ΔΤΔ)
 Sigma Pi (ΣΠ) (formerly Sigma Lambda Chi (ΣΛΧ))
 Tau Kappa Epsilon (ΤΚΕ)

Sororities 
 Delta Phi Epsilon (ΔΦΕ)
 Delta Xi Phi (ΔΞΦ) 
 Phi Sigma Sigma (ΦΣΣ) (formerly Phi Sigma Beta (ΦΣΒ))

Facilities

Alumni Center
Opened in 2010 and houses the College Advancement Division: Alumni & Constituent Relations, Development, and Marketing & Communications. This building is designed to accommodate reunion banquets, class meetings, job fairs, and other campus and community events.

The Commons
A first-year residence hall that houses 11 Living and Learning Communities (LLCs). Originally opened at the beginning of the fall semester of 2016 as the Living and Learning Commons, its name was shortened to The Commons at the beginning of the fall semester of 2018. It is the newest dorm on campus and it is the tallest building on campus and second tallest building in Keene.

Elliot Hall
Elliot Hall is home to on-campus services, including Admissions, the Financial Aid office, Student Accounts office, Academic & Career Advising, the Registrar's office, Health Services, and Transitions & Parent Programs. The Education Department's Child Development Center is located within this facility.

Fiske Hall
The oldest building on the campus, Fiske Hall has been a part of the college since its founding in 1909. It underwent renovations during the spring semester of 2007 following the opening of new residence halls elsewhere on campus, and reopened for the Fall 2007 semester. The Annex houses the college's Budgeting office, Purchasing office, and Human Resources office.

Hale Building
The Hale Building was constructed in 1861 and was the home of several New Hampshire governors. Hale now houses the offices of the College President, the Provost/VP for Academic Affairs, the Chief Diversity Officer, and other principal administrators.

Holloway Hall
A second-year residence hall that consists of three co-ed floors with a kitchen on each one. Each suite consists of two main rooms with a shared bathroom located between them.  Each room houses two or three residents, totaling up to 5 people per suite. Floors are broken up into parliaments by a common interest. There is a great hall with a piano, pingpong table, pool table, and a fireplace.

Huntress Hall
A co-ed residence hall (formerly a girls-only hall) situated on the main quad. It is one of the oldest dorms on campus and is rumored to be haunted by the ghost of its namesake, Harriet Lane Huntress, a former administrator in the New Hampshire Department of Education. The ghost was briefly mentioned on a show on the Travel Channel.

Media Arts Center
The Media Arts Center opened in the fall of 2006. It contains offices, classroom space, and lab space for the Film, Graphic Design, Communications, and Journalism departments. It was constructed in the former Zorn dining commons building following the completion of the New Zorn Dining Commons.

Mason Library
The Mason Library is home to the Cohen Center for Holocaust and Genocide Studies. This facility also houses KSC's reference collection, as well as a periodicals collection, a newspaper archive, and a video and DVD collection, which is surpassed by the collection held by the film department in the Media Arts Center.
The library is named for Wallace Edward (Daddy) Mason, who was the President of Keene Normal School from 1911 until 1939. (Striving, James G. Smart, Phoenix Publishing 1984). In 2018, a new wing of the building was opened which includes an expanded Cohen Center for Holocaust and Genocide Studies. In Fall 2021, the Center for Research & Writing moved from its original location on 81 Blake Street into a larger dedicated space in the Mason Library, offering peer tutoring services in speaking, researching, and writing processes.

Pondside II
Pondside II houses 120 co-ed residents - all juniors and seniors - in four-person, carpeted apartments. Each apartment consists of four single bedrooms, a shared bathroom, living area, and a kitchen equipped with a stove, oven, microwave, and refrigerator. Overhead lighting is provided in each bedroom and common area. Students who live in this area are responsible for cleaning and supplying their bathrooms.

Putnam Science Center
The David F. Putnam Science Center was recently renovated and is home to the Computer Science department and other major science fields. The KSC Science Center includes several computer labs containing 440 computers in total. All computers dual boot Windows/FreeBSD and have access to the wireless network.

Redfern Arts Center
The Redfern Arts Center on Brickyard Pond is home to the performing arts and visual arts on campus. It has three performance venues: the Alumni Recital Hall, home to musical performances and the annual KSC Film Festival; the Main Theatre, which hosts touring performances and college productions and can seat 572; and the Wright Theatre (formerly the Studio Theatre), which was named after Ruth McCaffery Wright '29, and dedicated in May 1995. The Wright Theatre is a flexible black box theatre, allowing for a variety of theatre configurations. It is used primarily by the Theatre and Dance Department as a performance space and classroom. The building also houses fine arts classes including painting, drawing, sculpture and printmaking.

Spaulding Gymnasium
The Spaulding Gymnasium and Recreation Center is open to all KSC students and faculty free of charge, and to the general public for a fee. In addition to the large main gym, it includes a pool, a suspended track, a weight room, and an aerobics room. Spaulding houses the Exercise Science and Athletic Training majors.

TDS Center
This building is used for the architecture department as well as the product design students. It also houses the Safety & Occupational Health Applied Sciences program - the increase in number of students majoring in the Safety & Occupational Health Applied Sciences program has allowed it to grow into a Master's program.

Thorne-Sagendorph Art Gallery
The Thorne-Sagendorph art gallery displays student work from the various traditional arts. It is occasionally host to touring exhibits and is open daily for viewing.

Young Student Center
The Young Student Center was named for Lloyd P. Young, who served as the school's president from 1939-1964. It is one of the tallest buildings on campus and is home to the campus bookstore, several food vendors, the campus mailroom, the Mabel Brown auditorium, the colleges' student-run radio station, WKNH, and student organization offices.

Zorn Dining Commons
The Zorn dining commons was formerly located in the building now known as Media Arts Center. Keene State built a much larger facility that opened in the fall of 2005. It features a variety of dining options. Within the Zorn building but outside the dining area proper is the Hoot-N-Scoot/SONO, a take-out facility with prepackaged meals.

Owl's Nests 
The Owl's Nests consist of 9 small buildings and a separate laundry building which together house sophomore-seniors. Rooms range from lofted suites, traditional suites, and singles.

References

External links

Official website
Official athletics website

 
Buildings and structures in Keene, New Hampshire
Public universities and colleges in New Hampshire
University System of New Hampshire
Educational institutions established in 1909
Universities and colleges in Cheshire County, New Hampshire
1909 establishments in New Hampshire
Liberal arts colleges in New Hampshire
Public liberal arts colleges in the United States